Johan Botha (born 10 January 1974) is a South African middle-distance runner who won the gold medal over 800 metres at the World Indoor Championships in Athletics in Maebashi in 1999. In the course of the race he defeated world record holder Wilson Kipketer and Nico Motchebon in a winning time of 1:45.47. In the same season he ran his indoor personal best of 1:45.45 in Stuttgart.
At the 2001 World Indoor Championships in Lisbon Botha came close to defending his title but was defeated by future Olympic champion Yuriy Borzakovskiy and won silver.

Outdoors he won a bronze medal at the 1998 Commonwealth Games. He reached the semifinals of the World Championships in 1999 and again at the Olympic Games in 2000. His outdoor personal best was 1:43.91, set in June 1999 in Oslo. Botha also has a personal best of 3:36:30 on the 1500m, which he ran in the Netherlands during 2000.

Competition record

External links
 

1974 births
Living people
Afrikaner people
South African male middle-distance runners
Athletes (track and field) at the 1996 Summer Olympics
Athletes (track and field) at the 2000 Summer Olympics
Olympic athletes of South Africa
Athletes (track and field) at the 1998 Commonwealth Games
Commonwealth Games medallists in athletics
Commonwealth Games bronze medallists for South Africa
World Athletics Indoor Championships winners
Athletes (track and field) at the 1999 All-Africa Games
African Games competitors for South Africa
Medallists at the 1998 Commonwealth Games